Collin's Ford Bridge, also known as Bridge #28, is a historic stone arch bridge located within Big Oaks National Wildlife Refuge (formerly Jefferson Proving Ground) in Shelby Township, Ripley County, Indiana.  It was built about 1907, and is a two-span, round-arch bridge constructed of limestone.  It measures 108 feet long and is 17 feet wide.  The property was acquired by the U.S. Army in 1941.

It was added to the National Register of Historic Places in 1996.

References

Road bridges on the National Register of Historic Places in Indiana
Bridges completed in 1907
Transportation buildings and structures in Ripley County, Indiana
National Register of Historic Places in Ripley County, Indiana
Stone arch bridges in the United States